Sørstranda or Rygg is a village in Gloppen Municipality in Vestland county, Norway. The village is located on the southwestern shore of the Gloppefjorden. The area is an old church site with the Old Gimmestad Church and the "new" Gimmestad Church both located here, which is why the area is also sometimes referred to as Gimmestad.

References

Villages in Vestland
Gloppen